Stüeckelberg may refer to:

Ernst Carl Gerlach Stueckelberg - Swiss theoretical physicist 
topics named after him:
Stueckelberg action
Stuckelberg diagrams
Stückelberg–Feynman interpretation
Stueckelberg formalism
Stückelberg (Taunus), a mountain in Hesse, Germany.